The 1936 Great Britain Lions tour was a tour by the Great Britain national rugby league team of Australia and New Zealand which took place between May and August 1936. The tour involved a schedule of 24 games, 16 in Australia including a three-test series against Australia for the Ashes and a further 8 in New Zealand including a two-test series against New Zealand.

Captained by Jim Brough the Lions returned home having won 21 and lost 3 of their games. They won the Ashes against Australia 2–1 and made a clean sweep against New Zealand winning both test matches.

Despite being a British team the team played as, and were universally referred to by both the press at home and away, as England.

Squad
A 26-man squad was selected for the tour with the names announced in March 1936 with Jim Sullivan named as captain. Two weeks after the squad was named, Sullivan withdrew from the squad due to the illness of his wife, the Rugby Football League (RFL) made Leeds  Jim Brough captain, moved Billy Belshaw from the centres to fullback and called up Wigan's Gwyn Davies to the vacancy in the centres. The squad that assembled in April 1936 comprised:

The two team managers were W. Poppleton of Bramley and R.F. Anderton of Warrington.

Schedule and results
The majority of the team sailed from Tilbury on 17 April 1936 on board the SS Cathay with the Leeds and Warrington players together with Hunslet's Harry Beverley departing by train on 24 May to meet the rest of the team at Marseilles. The split departure was due to the players being involved in the Challenge Cup final on 18 April and in Beverley's case due to a family illness. The team arrived in Melbourne on 25 May and travelled to Sydney by train the following day. 

Ashes series

First test

The first Ashes test was played at the Sydney Cricket Ground on 29 June 1936.  Interest in the game was so high that within half an hour of the gates opening at 9 am the ground was full despite kick-off not being until 3 pm.

Prior to the kick-off the newly instituted Courtney Goodwill Trophy was presented to Henry Flegg of the Australian Rugby League Board of Control by Ernest Farrar on behalf of the trophy donor, Roy Courtney.

Injury to England captain, Jim Brough, meant a re-organisation for the England team with Billy Belshaw playing at full-back and Arthur Atkinson captaining the side.  After Australian captain, David Brown scored an early penalty it was England who scored the first try when Harry Beverley scored from a scrum close to the Australian line. With the resulting conversion attempt missed England led 3–2.  The lead was not to last long as Brown kicked another penalty soon after to give Australia a 4–3 advantage.  These were the only scores of the first half but before half-time props Nat Silcock (England) and Ray Stehr (Australia) were sent off for fighting during a scrum.

The second half was all Australia's as they scored four converted tries through Brown with two and one each for Joe Pearce and Alan Ridley to lead 24–3 before Beverley scored a consolation try for England just before the end which Martin Hodgson converted.

Second test

The second test was played in Brisbane a week after the first test.  An unchanged Australian side were looking for a first Ashes series win since 1920.  England made several changes with Brough returning as captain at fullback with Belshaw returning to the centres in place of the injured Atkinson alongside Gus Risman as Brogden moved out to the wing in place of Morley.  Watkins replaced McCue at scrum-half while in the forwards Arkwright and Armitt replaced Miller and Field.

On a pitch that was heavy after a lot of rain, England made the better start winning more possession from the scrum than the Australians and this pressure led to the first try when Alan Edwards scored in the corner.  A Gus Risman penalty increased England's lead to 5–0 before Australia drew level with a try from winger Arch Crippin.  Retrieving a dropped England pass on his own  line Crippin ran the length of the pitch beating fullback Brough to score under the posts, leaving a simple conversation for Jack Beaton to level the scores.

In the second half, Edwards scored a second try for England form a scrum in much the same fashion as his first try and a successful conversion by Risman gave England a 10–5 lead which Australia reduced to a three-point lead when David Brown kicked a goal.  The final points of the game came from Martin Hodgson as he kicked a penalty resulting from offside close to the Australian line.

Third test

The deciding test in the series was played at the Sydney Cricket Ground of 18 July 1936.  England made only one change from the side that won the second test with  Belshaw replacing Brough, who was injured, as fullback and bringing Barney Hudson into the centres.  In the absences of Brough, Gus Risman captained the side for the first time.  Australia made two changes, giving a debut to half-back Fred Gilbert and recalling Peter Madsen three years after his previous international appearance.  Madsen was played at hooker, not his normal position - all his previous caps were at prop-forward - a decision later criticised in the Australian press.

Australia scored first with David Brown kicking a penalty halfway through the first half.  About five minutes before the end of the half England prop, Jack Arkwright and his Australian counterpart, Ray Stehr were both sent off for fighting.  This was the second time in the series that Stehr had been sent off and subsequently he was banned for three games while Arkwright was suspended until 31 July.  With time running out in the first half England scored the only try of the half as Stan Brogden kicked over the Australian backs and Barney Hudson collected the ball to score in the corner.  With Martin Hodgson converting the try, England led 5–2 at half-time.

In the second half the greater weight and skill of the English forwards saw England dominating play at the scrum, by the end of the game England had won 41 scrums to Australia's 14.  England's second try came from a scrum as Emlyn Jenkins passed to Brogden who scored.  Hodgson converted to make England's lead 10–2.  A further Hodgson goal made it 12–2 before Australia scored a try in the last minutes of the match as Vic Hey touched down   following a break through the English defence by Wally Prigg.  With Brown adding the conversion to bring the scores to 12–7, the last minutes were tense but England held on to win the match and the series.

New Zealand test series

First test

The English came into the first test at Carlaw Park, Auckland with the same back line up from the third test in Australia and only two changes in the forwards with Field and Troup replacing Arkwright and Beverley.  The game was one where the defences held the upper hand as England's dominance in the scrums was matched by New Zealand's backs controlling more of the open play.  The first half only saw one score with New Zealand captain Puti Watene kicking the goal which gave New Zealand a 2–0 lead at the interval.

The first try went to England when from a scrum near the halfway line a passing movement along the threequarter line ended with winger 
Alan Edwards scoring in the corner.  This gave England a narrow 3–2 lead which then changed hands twice as Watene and Hodgson traded goals.  England then scored another try, again from a scrum, as stand-off Emlyn Jenkins ran through the New Zealand defensive line to score.  With the conversion missed the score was 8–4 to England, two further penalties for Watene and Hodgson increased the score to 10–6.  New Zealand tried to score in the dying minutes of the game but Thomas Trevarthan could only manage a field goal with the last play of the game to give England a 10–8 victory.

Second test

The second test was played a week after the first, again at Carlaw Park in Auckland.  England made one change with Jack Arkwright replacing Martin Hodgson in the forwards.  New Zealand made two changes bringing Claude Dempsey in at fullback and Ted Mincham on the wing.

England opened the scoring with a Gus Risman penalty before Puti Watene levelled the score with a penalty.  New Zealand had a try disallowed before England scored their first try as Arkwright scored from a try.  Risman converted to make the score 7–2.  Further tries from Alan Edwards and Jack Miller together with a Risman conversion gave England a 15–2 half-time advantage.

The start of the second half saw New Zealand with the advantage as a try by Joe Cootes sandwiched between two Watene penalties, and a Watene conversion brought New Zealand within four points of England.  A further attack by New Zealand which would have closed the gap to one-point ended with England extending their lead as Barney Hudson intercepted a New Zealand pass and scored a try.  Risman's conversion and a second try for Arkwright made the score 23–11 to England.  Just before full-time England stand-off Emlyn Jenkins was sent off for arguing with the referee.

References

Great Britain national rugby league team tours
Great Britain Lions tour of Australia and New Zealand
Great Britain Lions tour of Australia and New Zealand
Great Britain Lions tour of Australia and New Zealand
Rugby league tours of Australia
Rugby league tours of New Zealand